

Wighelm is a probable Bishop of Selsey.

Wighelm's see is uncertain, but as he is the sole episcopal witness on a charter, involving land in the area, suggests that he had authority in Sussex.

Wighelm died sometime between 909 and 925.

Citations

References

Further reading

External links
 

Bishops of Selsey
10th-century English bishops
9th-century births
10th-century deaths
Year of birth unknown
Year of death unknown